Florence Angela L. Hoath (born 12 July 1984) is a retired British actress.

The daughter of British actress Tina Martin, Hoath was born in London and made her film debut in the 1993 screen adaptation of Secret Rapture at the age of eight. Since then she has starred in a number of film and television productions, including the 2005 Doctor Who episodes "The Empty Child" and "The Doctor Dances". Also in that year, Hoath was cast to play the regular role of George Fitzgerald in Channel 5's daytime soap Family Affairs, but the show was cancelled weeks after her introduction, the final episode being broadcast in December 2005.

Hoath's last screen credit was a role in the 2008 television miniseries Lost in Austen. In an interview published in Doctor Who Magazine during March 2015, she confirmed she was no longer acting.

Selected filmography
 A Pin for the Butterfly (1994)
 Innocent Lies (1995)
 The Haunting of Helen Walker (1995)
 The Demon Headmaster (1996)
 FairyTale: A True Story (1997)
 The Governess (1998)
 Tom's Midnight Garden (1999)
 Back to the Secret Garden (2001)
 The Cazalets (2001)
 Goodbye, Mr. Chips (2002)
 Agatha Christie's Marple (2004)
 Doctor Who "The Empty Child" and "The Doctor Dances"(2005)
 Family Affairs (2005)
 Bike Squad (2008)
 Doctors (2008)
 Lost in Austen (2008)

Awards and nominations

References

External links
 

British television actresses
British film actresses
1984 births
Living people
Actresses from London
20th-century English actresses
21st-century English actresses
English child actresses
English film actresses
English television actresses